Colin Davis (born October 13, 1974 in Klamath Falls, Oregon) is an American musician, audio engineer and record producer  currently residing in Seattle, WA.  His musical styles range between rock, ska and electronic music. Colin currently plays bass and provides backing vocals for Vanowen, a Seattle based rock band signed to London Tone Music Group.

History

Colin Davis has previously played bass for Olympia, WA based ska ensemble Engine 54 between 1998–99.  He shares bass credit on their Simmerdown Productions release Run for the Money with bassist Chris Sutton who had recently departed the group to join Dub Narcotic Sound System.  In 2002 he produced an EP for Seattle-based rock group RC5 titled Run Baby Run for Seattle record label Buttermilk Records.  In 2003–2004 Colin engineered and mixed a series of EP's for Los Angeles based Electronic Music artist Take (currently known as Sweatson Klank).

Selected Discography

References

External links
Vanowen official band page
All Music Guide: Colin Davis
London Tone Music Group

Living people
1974 births
American rock musicians
Record producers from Oregon
People from Klamath Falls, Oregon